Faruk Dedić (born 14 November 1971) is a Bosnian professional football manager. He ist the current manager of Stupčanica Olovo.

Managerial statistics

References

External links
NK Bosna Visoko at sportsport.ba

1971 births
Living people
Sportspeople from Sarajevo
Bosnia and Herzegovina football managers
NK Bosna Visoko managers